The ASH 31 is a single seat Open Class glider which can also be flown in the 18 metre class configuration.

Design and development
The ASH 31 was announced at the end of 2008 by Alexander Schleicher. The glider was developed as a replacement for the ASH 26. The self-launching Mi version is powered by a  Wankel engine.

The improvements over the ASH 26 and ASG 29 are given as:
 Extended ailerons
 Redesigned wing structure

Variants
ASH 31
Production aircraft with a wingspan of either 18-metres or 21-metres.
ASH 31 Mi
Production aircraft with a retractable engine and propeller for self-launching. It can be flown with a wingspan of either 18-metres or 21-metres.

Specifications (21-metre)

See also

Notes

References

External links

Schleicher website

2000s German sailplanes
Schleicher aircraft
Motor gliders
T-tail aircraft
Shoulder-wing aircraft
Single-engined tractor aircraft
Aircraft first flown in 2009